Mohammed Karim (1896–1972) was an Egyptian film director, writer, and producer. Karim brought Faten Hamama to fame in the movie Yawm Said. His 1946 film Dunia was entered into the 1946 Cannes Film Festival.

References

External links

1896 births
Egyptian film directors
Egyptian film producers
1972 deaths